Asteropeia multiflora is a plant species in the Asteropeiaceae family. It is endemic to Madagascar.  Its natural habitat is sandy shores.

References

Endemic flora of Madagascar
multiflora
Least concern plants
Taxonomy articles created by Polbot